AVY may refer to:
 The National Rail code for Aberdovey railway station, United Kingdom
 The Ticker symbol for Avery Dennison

Avy may refer to:
 An avalanche
 Avy, Charente-Maritime, a commune in France
 an internet slang term for avatar (computing)
 Avy B.V., a Dutch company which develops and operates drones